Amateur radio call signs in Africa are codes used to identify all radio communications, broadcasts and transmissions. The International Telecommunication Union assigns Africa as ITU region #1.  It has assigned call signs prefix blocks to countries including 77 DXCC entities in and off-shore of Africa.  Western Sahara is not a DXCC entity but uses SØ as a prefix.

Amateur radio or ham radio is practised by operators holding nationally allocated call signs in African countries or foreign administered territories and other nations or DXCC entities.  Call sign allocation from the International Telegraph Union is administered by national political authorities and international mandates.

Call sign blocks

The following call sign blocks are used for all radio communication, broadcasting or transmission:

CQ Zone 33/northwest Africa, European territories

In Morocco CN8 is for residents, CNØ is for visitors.  SØ for Western Sahara is an unofficial prefix, not issued by the ITU.

CQ Zone 34/northeast Africa

Sudan further subdivides its call signs thus (with possible changes due to the 2011 independence of South Sudan): ST2 Khartoum and its region, ST3 Wad Madani, central region, ST4 Al Ubayyid, Kurdufan region, ST5 Kassala, eastern region, ST6 Port Sudan, northeast region, ST7 Ad'Damir, northwest region, ST8 Al'Fashir, Darfour region, and ST9 Malakal, central-south region; Wau, Bahr-al-Ghazal region.

CQ Zone 35/west coast (northern) central Africa

Nigeria further subdivides its prefixes thus: 5N1 = OGUN, OYO, ONDO; 5N2 = KWARA, KOGI, NIGER, OSUN; 5N3 = EDO, DELTA, ANAMBRA; 5N4 = ENUGU, RIVERS, ABIA; 5N5 = CROSS RIVERS, AKWA-IBOM, IMO, BENUE; 5N6 = PLATEAU, TARABA, BAUCHI; 5N7 = ADAMAWA, YOBE, BORNO; 5N8 = KANO, JIGAWA; 5N9 = KADUNA, SOKOTO, KEBBI, KATSINA; and 5NØ = LAGOS STATE AND ABUJA, F.C.T.

Senegal further subdivides its prefixes thus: 6W1 Dakar, 6W2 Ziguinchor, 6W3 Diourbei, 6W4 St. Louis 6W5 Tambacounda, 6W6 Kaolack, 6W7 Thies, 6W8 Louga, 6W9 Fatick and 6WØ Kolda.

Liberia further subdivides its prefixes thus: EL1 Grand Bassa, River Cess, EL2 Montserrado, Bomi, Margibi, EL3 Sinoe, EL4 Maryland, Grand Kru, EL5 Lofa, EL6 Grand Gedeh, EL7 Bong, EL8 Nimba, EL9 Grand Cape Mount, and ELØ for Novices and Club Stations

CQ Zone 36/west coast (southern) central Africa

Democratic Republic of Congo (Zaire) further subdivides its call signs thus: 9Q1 – Kinshasa, 9Q2 – Bas Congo, 9Q3 – Bandundu, 9Q4 – Equateur, 9Q5 – Province orientale, 9Q6 – North Kivu, South Kivu, Maniema, 9Q7– Katanga, 9Q8 – Oriental Kasai, 9Q9 – Occidental Kasai, and 9QØ – Reserved

CQ Zone 37/east coast mainland Africa

For Eritrea only contacts made November 14, 1962, and before, or May 24, 1991, and after, count for this entity.

Tanzania further subdivides its prefix thus: 5H1 – Zanzibar and Pemba Islands, 5H2 – Arysha, Kilimanjaro, Tanga, 5H3 – Pwani, Dar es Salaam (including Mafia Island), 5H4 – Morogoro, 5H5 – Lindi, Mtwara, Ruvuma, 5H6 – Iringa, 5H7 – Mbeya, 5H8 – Kigoma, Rukwa, Tabora, 5H9 – Ziwa Magharibi, Mwanza, Mara, Shinyanga (including Ukerewe Islands), and 5HØ – Dodoma, Singida.

Somalia further subdivides its call signs according to the province of issue: 6OØ indicates the license was issued in Puntland, Northern Somalia, and; 6O1 is issued in Southern Somalia.

CQ Zone 38/southern Africa

South Africa
South Africa further divides its call signs thus:
 ZS1 Western Cape Province
 ZS2 Eastern Cape Province
 ZS3 Northern Cape Province
 ZS4 Free State Province
 ZS5 Kwazulu-Natal Province
 ZS6 Gauteng, Mpumalanga, Northwest and Limpopo provinces
 ZS7 Antarctica
 ZS8 Marion Is
 ZU Designates an entry level licence
 ZR Used to designate a restricted licence but has been merged into the unrestricted class together with ZS and follows the same region numbers as above
 ZT Very rarely used only for contest stations
 ZSLnnn call sign is allocated to 'Shortwave Listeners'.

CQ Zone 39/Africa off-shore, Indian Ocean

History of call sign allocation

The call sign allocation history of mainland Africa and off-shore islands is complex and related to the colonial status of European powers in the early-20th century period.  Call signs changed in relation to various independence movements, particularly following World War II and in the 1960s.

International Radiotelegraph Conferences
The conference held in 1927 assigned call prefixes to Morocco (CNA–CNZ), Egypt (SUA–SUZ), Republic of Liberia (ELA–ELZ), Ethiopia (ETA–ETZ), and the Union of South Africa (ZSA–ZUZ).  These, however, did not necessarily include amateur radio operation.  African areas administered politically by colonizing countries (i.e. Great Britain, Portugal, France, etc.) adopted call signs issued to those countries for colonial purposes.

The 1947 Atlantic City ITU Conference reallocated call sign blocks to African countries and European colonies according to this table.

See also
 Amateur radio international operation
 Amateur radio license
 Call signs
 ITU prefix – amateur and experimental stations

References

Africa
Communications in Africa
Mass media in Africa